Two ships of the Royal Australian Navy have been named HMAS Labuan after the World War II amphibious landings at Labuan:

, formerly HMA LST 3501, a Mark III tank landing ship commissioned in 1946, named in 1948, and sold off in 1955
, a Balikpapan-class heavy landing craft commissioned in 1973, decommissioned in 2014, and transferred to Papua New Guinea

Battle honours
Ships named HMAS Labuan are entitled to carry a single battle honour:
East Timor 1999–2000

References

Royal Australian Navy ship names